Charles Joseph "Charlie" (sometimes spelled "Charley") Kelly (February 18, 1859 – June 15, 1918), known professionally as Charles J. Ross or Charley Ross, was a Canadian-American entertainer, composer and theatrical producer who performed in vaudeville, burlesque, and on the stage. Ross and his wife, Mabel Fenton, became popular for their parodies of classical plays.

Early life
Ross was born Charles Joseph Kelly to William and Caroline (née Brown) Kelly at Montreal, Quebec, where his father was employed as a carpenter.

Career
Ross began as a circus entertainer with P. T. Barnum before his stage debut on April 5, 1885, at Miner's Bowery Theatre in Manhattan as a singer and impersonator. Next he performed with Herman's Transatlantic in a variety act at the Atlantic Gardens Bowery Theater. Over the next few years, Ross would develop his talent as a farce comedian playing with vaudeville companies in New York and on the road.

Ross married actress Ada Towne (known professionally as Mabel Fenton) on June 9, 1887, during a stopover at Deadwood, South Dakota amidst a vaudeville tour of the American West. The couple soon created the act Ross and Fenton and within two years became a staple of the Weber and Fields Company in New York performing their farce productions of classic and popular plays of the day. Ross later formed his own company and continued to perform well into the early decades of the twentieth century. The couple appeared in at least two films: Death of Nancy Sykes (1897) and How Molly Malone Made Good (1915).

In the late 1890s, Ross and his wife opened Ross Fenton Farm, a resort hotel in Asbury Park, New Jersey that also doubled as their primary residence. For a number of years, Ross Fenton Farm was a popular mecca for New York area artist and entertainers. Most of the resort burned to the ground in 1950. Some of the original houses are still standing, including the main house of Charles Ross and Mable Fenton.

Death
Ross died on June 15, 1918, at Ross Fenton Farm after a long illness and failed operation. Ross' wife Mabel died on April 19, 1931, in Los Angeles at the age of 66. They are buried together at Glenwood Cemetery in West Long Branch, New Jersey.

Broadway credits

Filmography

References

External links

 
 
 

1859 births
1918 deaths
19th-century American male actors
20th-century American male actors
19th-century Canadian male actors
20th-century Canadian male actors
American male musical theatre actors
American musical theatre composers
American male silent film actors
American male stage actors
American theatre managers and producers
Burials in New Jersey
American burlesque performers
Canadian emigrants to the United States
Canadian expatriate male actors in the United States
Canadian male musical theatre actors
Canadian musical theatre composers
Canadian male silent film actors
Canadian male stage actors
Canadian theatre managers and producers
Male actors from Montreal
People from Asbury Park, New Jersey
Vaudeville performers
19th-century American male singers
19th-century American singers
19th-century American businesspeople